This is list of archives in the Netherlands.

Archives in the Netherlands 
 Afrika-Studiecentrum, African library and archive, Leiden
 Amsterdam City Archives
 Dutch Institute for War Documentation, Amsterdam
 Expatriate Archive Centre, The Hague
 International Institute of Social History, Amsterdam
 Atria Institute on gender equality and women's history, Amsterdam
 IHLIA LGBT Heritage, Amsterdam
 Leiden University Library, special collections
 Nationaal Archief, The Hague
 Noord-Hollands Archief, Haarlem
 Spaarnestad Photo, Haarlem
 Historisch Centrum Overijssel, Zwolle
 Regionaal Archief Rivierenland, Tiel
 Zuid-Afrikahuis, South African library and archive, Amsterdam

See also 

 List of archives
 List of museums in the Netherlands
 Culture of the Netherlands

Further reading
  + recent issues. 1892-

External links 
 Groninger Archieven
 Tresoar
 Drents Archief
 Historisch Centrum Overijssel
 Nieuw Land Erfgoedcentrum
 Gelders Archief
 Het Utrechts Archief
 Noord-Hollands Archief
 Zeeuws Archief
 Brabants Historisch Informatie Centrum
 Regionaal Historisch Centrum Limburg
 Nationaal Archief

 
Archives
Netherlands
Archives